"The Lazy Song" is a song by American singer-songwriter Bruno Mars for his debut studio album Doo-Wops & Hooligans (2010). It was serviced to contemporary hit radios in the United States on February 15, 2011, as the album's third single by Atlantic and Elektra. Development of "The Lazy Song" began while Mars, Philip Lawrence and Ari Levine were hanging around the studio and didn't feel like working. The trio, produced the track under their alias, the Smeezingtons, and wrote the song in collaboration with singer-songwriter K'naan. Musically, "The Lazy Song" has been described as borrowing "heavily from roots reggae" and has been compared to the reggae style of Jason Mraz, while lyrically it is an anthem to laziness.

"The Lazy Song" reached number four on the US Billboard Hot 100, while it topped the charts in Denmark and in the United Kingdom. It charted on most markets within the top five. It was certified seven times platinum by the Recording Industry Association of America (RIAA), five times by the Australian Recording Industry Association (ARIA) and four times by Music Canada (MC), respectively. It was one of the best selling digital singles of 2011 with sales of 6.5 million copies. Cameron Duddy and Mars directed the accompanying music video, in which Mars hangs out with five dancers wearing monkey masks while jesting around in his underwear. Mars sang "The Lazy Song" on the television show American Idol and performed it during The Doo-Wops & Hooligans Tour (2010–12), the Hooligans in Wondaland Tour (2011), and occasionally on The Moonshine Jungle Tour (2013–14).

Development and production
In an interview with Sound on Sound, Ari Levine explained how they came up with the song "[It] was a very tough song to write, even though it is so simple. That song began one day when we were hanging around the studio and hadn't written a song for a few days and we were kind of burnt out and didn't feel like working. We felt lazy. 'K'naan' was in the studio with us, and the four of us suddenly came up with this idea." He added, "After that we had a really hard time getting the groove and the drums to sit right. Once you have one piece of the puzzle, like when you realise that a drum track is good, you can add other things in after that." Bruno Mars affirmed that they were trying to be "magical and historic" thus creating a track "that was better than the Beatles". Due to the frustration of not being able to do so, Mars said "Today I don't feel like doing anything at all", which according to him was an eye-opener. In 2013, on the GQ Cover Story, the artist revealed that he didn't like the song.

"The Lazy Song" was written by Mars, Philip Lawrence, Levine and K'naan, while production was handled by the former three production-team, the Smeezingtons. Levine and Mars played all the instruments on the track and recorded them. The former was also responsible for engineering the song at Levcon Studios in Los Angeles, California. Jash Negandhi (DJ Dizzy) was responsible for the scratching on the track. The single was mixed at Larrabee Sound Studios in Los Angeles, California by Manny Marroquin, while Christian Plata and Erik Madrid served as the assistants for mix. It was mastered by Stephen Marcussen at Marcussen Mastering in Hollywood, California.

Composition

"The Lazy Song" is a reggae, reggae-pop and ska track, borrowing "heavily from roots reggae". According to the digital sheet music published by Alfred Music Publishing, the song was written in the key of B major and is set in time signature of common time with a tempo of 88 beats per minute, with Mars's vocal range spanning from F4 to B5. "The Lazy Song" instrumentation features scratching and a drum beat. Its production has been compared to the reggae style of Jason Mraz and Sugar Ray. Tim Sendra of AllMusic said it was one of the tracks from Doo-Wops & Hooligans that captured the laid-back groove.

Lewis Corner, reviewer of Digital Spy wrote that "Bruno pulls a sickie in this reggae-pop number about, well, absolutely nothing." Corner described Mars as a "couch potato of the daytime TV variety" due to the lyrics of the song "I'm gonna kick my feet up then stare at the fan/ Turn the TV on, throw my hand in my pants". Lyrically, the song makes reference to MTV, the P90X home fitness DVDs, and the Cali Swag District song "Teach Me How to Dougie" (2010). Eric Henderson of Slant Magazine noted the lyrics "paints a portrait of Al Bundy as a young man". The Scotsman considered the song a "celebration of head-in-the-sand idleness and irresponsibility". Similarly, Jim Farber of Daily News dubbed it a "hymn to sloth". The single version of the song is three minutes and eight seconds and features whistling, which is not present on the album version, which is three minutes and fifteen seconds.

Release
"The Lazy Song" was the third single to be released from Mars's debut studio album Doo-Wops & Hooligans (2010). Atlantic and Elektra Records released the song, initially for airplay on contemporary hit radio in the United States, on February 15, 2011. Later, on May 8 and 9, 2011, the single was released in the UK via digital download and as a CD single, respectively, containing both the single edit version and The Hooligans remix of "Grenade", by the Warner Music Group, respectively. On February 18, 2011, it was released as a digital download in New Zealand, containing the single version of the song. On May 27, 2011, the CD single was released on Germany, Austria and Switzerland.

Critical reception
"The Lazy Song" has received generally mixed reviews from contemporary music critics. When reviewing the album, Tony Clayton-Lea of The Irish Times put the recording on the download list. Sean Fennessey, a reviewer of The Washington Post, felt the song was written in a "quality that is both endearing and damning". A mixed review came from Digital Spy reviewer Lewis Corner, who commented that the song is a "summery ditty more head-boppable than a Churchill nodding dog, which, given his current state of mind, is probably about all he could muster", giving it three stars out of five. and from Blues & Soul magazine who called it "reggae tinged" and found it to be "somewhat of a filler but for the likes of Peter Andre" is great. Andy Gill of The Independent classified the song as a "laidback acoustic groove", that displays "a flimsy reggae-lite gloss". Entertainment Weeklys Leah Greenblatt considered that "other modes suit him less well; The Lazy Song is perhaps better left to Jason Mraz".

Alexis Petridis of The Guardian, gave the song a negative review, writing that "The Lazy Song" "gets no further than the second verse before Mars – nothing if not keen to keep his fans abreast of his every activity in a world of 360-degree connectivity – announces that he's planning on having a wank".

Accolades
In 2011, the song received a nomination at the MP3Music Awards for "The BNC Award Best/New/Act", but lost. It also received a nomination for the Choice Summer Song award at the 2011 Teen Choice Awards. In 2011, the song was nominated at the NRJ Music Awards and Billboard Music Awards for, respectively, International Song of the Year and Top Streaming Song (Video). In 2012, at the ASCAP Pop Music Awards, "The Lazy Song" was one of the winners of Most Performed Songs, and at the RTHK International Pop Poll Awards won "Top 10 Gold International Gold Songs". The song, according to Spotify and 300,000 users, was considered a "Hangover Cure".

Commercial performance
"The Lazy Song" spent a total of 27 weeks on the US Billboard Hot 100 chart and peaked at number four. It also peaked at number three on Billboard'''s Pop Songs chart and at number two on the Adult Top 40 chart. The single sold over 1 million digital copies in the United States in May 2011, becoming Mars's fifth consecutive million-selling single as a solo and featured artist combined. The song has sold 3,262,000 digital copies in the United States as of September 2012. It has been certified seven times platinum by the Recording Industry Association of America (RIAA). The song rose to number 5 on the Canadian Hot 100 chart, having started at number 85 on March 19, 2011. It was certified four times platinum by Music Canada (MC).

In New Zealand, it debuted at number eighteen on the New Zealand Singles Chart on February 28, 2011, and peaked at number three. It entered the Australian ARIA Singles Chart at number ten on February 28, 2011, and eventually reached number six. It was certified five times platinum by the Australian Recording Industry Association (ARIA). In the United Kingdom, "The Lazy Song" peaked at the top of the UK Singles Chart, becoming Mars's third solo chart topper, and fourth in total, in Britain, as well as his third chart-topping song there in under a year following "Just the Way You Are" and "Grenade". The song has sold 747,000 copies in the United Kingdom as of October 2016 and was certified two times platinum by the British Phonographic Industry (BPI).

The single debuted at number 18 on the Denmark and peaked at number one. In Germany it reached number nine. "The Lazy Song" started at number 26 in the Dutch Top 40 on April 2, 2011, and peaked at number four in its eighth week on the chart. The single debuted at number ten on the Ö3 Austria Top 40 and peaked at number four. In Switzerland it entered the singles chart at number 29 and climbed to number nine. In Italy, it peaked at number ten in the FIMI Singles Chart Italy and was certified double platinum by the Federazione Industria Musicale Italiana (FIMI). It was one of the best selling digital singles of 2011 with sales of 6.5 million copies.

Music videos
Background and development
Mars was able to watch the video his label had produced for the song prior to the release of Doo-Wops & Hooligans. Finding that it did not represent the song the way he wanted, the singer asked the label to record another. The latter agreed and gave him a "couple thousand dollars" to do so. With it, Mars bought monkey masks and shot the video in two days in Los Angeles, California. After filming 12 takes, the tenth was the one chosen. Presented as a one shot video, it was directed by Mars and Cameron Duddy.

Synopsis

The video opens with Mars sporting black sunglasses and a flannel shirt, singing and hanging out in a bedroom with five similarly-dressed dancers wearing chimpanzee masks. While Mars sings about what he feels like doing on a day off, he and the dancers perform boy-band-reminiscent dance moves and fool around in mimicry of the song's lyrics. Fellow Smeezingtons member Philip Lawrence makes a cameo appearance, lip-syncing the line "Oh my God, this is great!", before being driven off by the dancers. When Mars sings "I'll just strut in my birthday suit/and let everything hang loose!", they drop their pants. The video ends with him pouring yellow confetti over the dancers then striking a pose together with them, and the returned Lawrence, for the camera.

American dance group Poreotics appear in the video as the masked dancers.

Reception
The music video was nominated at the 2011 MTV Video Music Awards for Best Choreography. The UK Music Video Awards also recognized it with a nomination in the "Best Pop Video – UK" category at the 2011 ceremony. The music video was nominated at the Myx Music Awards 2012 for Favorite International Video. As of March 2021, the music video has received over 2 billion views on YouTube.

Alternate version
An alternate music video, directed by Nez and produced by Anne Johnson, was released in May 2011. It features Leonard Nimoy wearing a bathrobe and slippers all day, "enjoy[ing] the lazy life". He is seen wandering around the neighborhood, visiting the supermarket for "jello and milk", and flipping off his neighbours. Mars and Lawrence make a cameo in the video, walking out of the grocery store as Nimoy walks in. Nimoy's Star Trek castmate William Shatner also makes a brief appearance.

Live performances and other media
It was first performed live on Kidd Kraddick, on October 19, 2010. On October 22, 2010, a "soulful" arrangement of the song was sung for a Billboard Tastemakers video session. On April 28, 2011, he performed the song on the tenth season of American Idol. Mars also performed it at the NBA All-Star Tip Off Pre-Show in February 2011. The song was also performed on NBC's Today Show on June 24, 2011. According to MTV's Dannielle Genet, the singer "really got the crowd amped" during the performance of the track. On June 28 of that year Mars performed in the X Factor finale of France with the two finalists. On July 27, 2011, he performed the song at KIIS FM. It was the seventh song of his debut world tour, The Doo-Wops & Hooligans Tour (2010), the eight song on the Hooligans in Wondaland Tour (2011), and it was performed in Australia, Asia and on the second North America leg of his world tour, The Moonshine Jungle Tour (2013–14). In 2020, American singer-songwriter Bennett covered "The Lazy Song" as part of the tenth anniversary of Mars's debut album.

Track listing

Personnel
Credits adapted from the liner notes of Doo-Wops & Hooligans''.

 Bruno Mars – lead vocals, instrumentation, songwriting
 Philip Lawrence – songwriting
 Ari Levine – engineer, instrumentation, songwriting
 K'naan – songwriting
 The Smeezingtons – production

 Jash Negandhi (DJ Dizzy) – Scratching
 Manny Marroquin – mixing
 Christian Plata – mixing assistant
 Erik Madrid – mixing assistant
 Stephen Marcussen – mastering

Charts

Weekly charts

Year-end charts

Certifications

Release history

See also
 List of Billboard Hot 100 top 10 singles in 2011
 List of number-one hits of 2011 (Denmark)
 List of number-one singles of 2010 (Hungary)
 List of UK R&B Singles Chart number ones of 2011
 List of UK Singles Chart number ones of the 2010s

References

External links

2010 songs
2011 singles
American reggae songs
Bruno Mars songs
Reggae fusion songs
Ska songs
Song recordings produced by the Smeezingtons
Songs written by Bruno Mars
Songs written by Ari Levine
Songs written by Philip Lawrence (songwriter)
Number-one singles in Denmark
UK Singles Chart number-one singles
Atlantic Records singles
Elektra Records singles
Songs written by K'naan
Music videos directed by Cameron Duddy